{{Infobox legislature
 | name               = Vellore Corporation
 | transcription_name =
 | legislature        =
 | coa_pic            = 
 | coa_res            = 
 | coa_alt            = 
 | coa-pic            =
 | coa-res            =
 | house_type         = Municipal Corporation
 | body               = Vellore
 | houses             =
 | leader1_type       = Mayor
 | leader1            = Sujatha Anandakumar
 | party1             =DMK 
 | election1          =4 March 2022
 | leader2_type       = Deputy Mayor
 | leader2            =M. Sunil Kumar 
 | party2             =DMK 
 | election2          =4 March 2022
 | leader3_type       = Commissioner
 | leader3            = P. Rathinasamy, IAS
 | party3             =
 | election3          =
 | leader4_type       = District Collector
 | leader4            = P. Kumaravel Pandian, IAS
 | party4             =
 | election4          =
 | leader5_type       =
 | leader5            =
 | party5             =
 | election5          =
 | members            = 60
 | house1             =
 | house2             =
 | structure1         =
 | structure1_res     =
 | structure2         =
 | structure2_res     =
 | political_groups1  =Government (46)SPA (46) DMK (45)
 INC (1)Opposition (9) AIADMK (7)
 BJP (1)Others (6)Independent (6)
 | political_groups2  =
 | committees1        =
 | committees2        =
 | voting_system1     =
 | voting_system2     =
 | last_election1     =
 | last_election2     =
 | session_room       =
 | session_res        = 
 | meeting_place      = 
 | website            = 
 | footnotes          =
}}Vellore Corporation''' is a civic body that governs the city of Vellore, Tamil Nadu, India. Vellore corporation consist of 60 wards and is headed by a mayor who presides over a Deputy Mayor and 60 Councillors who represent each wards in the city.

Demographics
As per the 2011 census results, Vellore UA has a population of above 8 lakhs. City Population grew from 423,425 in 2001 to 502,000 in 2011.
Vellore City consists of Sathuvachari, Vallalar, Dharapadavedu, Shenbakkam, Allapuram, Fort, Kaspa, Vasanthapuram, Thiyagarajapuram, Thottapalayam, Saidapet, Thorapadi, Hazrath makkan, Otteri, Velapadi, Salavanpet, Rangapuram, Bagayam, Kazhinjur, Gandhi Nagar, Katpadi, Palavansaathu, Virupakshipuram, Konavattam, Virudampet, Kangeyanallur, Idaynsaathu, Sripuram, Alamelumangapuram(A.M.Puram) and Chitheri.

Total area spans across 20 km approximately. Total area is 87.915 km² according to the G.O.(Rt).No. 221 Dated 28.09.2010 issued by Tamil Nadu government. The population of Vellore Corporation based on that GO as of 2001 was 423,425. Vellore City Municipal Corporation is divided into four zones namely katpadi, Sathuvachari, Vellore Fort and Shenbakkam.

According to 2011 census Vellore agglomeration population is 481,966. In 2011 Census Data they have missed out three places. The census bureau has listed the city population as UA population. Actual population of Vellore including the missed out places, will be 502,000 and the population of Vellore UA will be more than 7.5 Lakhs.

History
Vellore town was constituted as a third-grade municipality in 1866, promoted to first – grade during 1947, further moved to Selection – Grade from 1997. Due to the increasing population and income it was declared as Special Grade Municipality w.e.f. 01.01.1979 and became Municipal Corporation from 1st August 2008. Vellore City Municipal Corporation has 60 wards and there will be an elected councilor for each wards respectively

Corporation Administratives
Mayor - Mrs. Sujatha Anandhakumar DMK

Deputy mayor - Mr. Sunil DMK

Corporation Commissioner - Mr. P.Rathinasamy IAS

Members of council

Dravida Munnetra Kazhagam - 45 members

Indian National Congress - 1 member

All India Anna Dravida Munnetra Kazhagam - 7 members

Bharatiya Janata Party - 1 member 

Pattali Makkal Katchi - 1 member  

Independent politicians - 6 members

References

External links
  official website

Vellore
Municipal corporations in Tamil Nadu
1866 establishments in British India
2008 establishments in Tamil Nadu